Middletown First Aid and Rescue Squad is located in Middletown Township, New Jersey. It is completely volunteer agency providing basic life support services for medical emergencies for the residents and visitors of Middletown Twp. It was established in 1933.

Middletown First Aid consists of approximately 14 members who are Emergency Medical Technician-Basic and are able to take charge of calls and handle patient care. Supplemental members of the squad include reserve, drivers, probationary, and diver-only members.

Middletown First Aid answers calls for medical emergencies, trauma, behavior emergencies, motor vehicle accidents, assist the fire department, vehicle extrication, and water rescue.

Apparatus 
 350 – 2009 Ford Explorer. First responder vehicle for quick response to emergencies. 350 is not equipped to transport patients. 
 351 – 2004 Ford type III ambulance. 351 is equipped with Hurst extrication tools and is the first due for any motor vehicle accidents 
 352 – 2000 GMC type III ambulance
 353 – Water Rescue Unit. Equipped for response to any water rescue emergency. 
 354/354A – Two 12 foot inflatable boats. Equipped for quick response to minor water emergencies. 
 355 – 1988 GMC diesel Extrication Unit. Equipped with Hurst vehicle extrication tools, vehicle stabilization equipment, two winches,  air systems, and oxygen tanks for mass casualty incidents.

Water rescue 

The Water Rescue Unit is commanded by a Captain and a Lieutenant. The unit specializes in underwater search and recovery, ice rescue, and boat rescues. The team consists of approximately 10 certified divers, boat operators, and dive tenders.

September 11th terrorist attacks 

Middletown First Aid and Rescue Squad utilized many of its resources after the September 11th terrorist attacks on New York City. Middletown First Aid along with other members of the Middletown EMS set up a staging and treatment center for the Highlands Ferry. Many of the victims and people in New York City took the ferry service to escape the city. The EMS services assisted in the decontamination of debris from the tower collapse, treatment of minor injuries on scene, and triage and transport to area hospitals. Middletown First Aid coordinated most of these efforts. 
Middletown First Aid and Rescue Squad sent members in Rescue 355 into the city in the rescue efforts at ground zero. The teams utilized the tools of the truck to remove debris and searched for survivors at the scene.

External links 
 http://www.mtfars.com
 http://www.middletownems.org
 http://www.middletownnj.org

Middletown Township, New Jersey
Emergency services in New Jersey
Ambulance services in the United States
Medical and health organizations based in New Jersey